"Sally's Pigeons" is a pop song by Cyndi Lauper that was featured on her 1993 album Hat Full of Stars, as well as the greatest hits albums Twelve Deadly Cyns...and Then Some and The Great Cyndi Lauper. It was released as the album's second single in some countries, and as its third in others. The song was inspired by the story of a childhood friend of Lauper, who in her teens got pregnant, had a back-alley abortion, and died as a result. The song was co-written with Mary Chapin Carpenter. Lauper was a childhood fan of Elton John, and as a tribute to him, "Sally's Pigeons" contains references to "Tiny Dancer," a song that Lauper has revealed to always make her cry. The song's music video features Julia Stiles and Blaze Berdahl, the latter portraying Sally.

Critical reception
Mike DeGagne of AllMusic spoke of the song in a review of the Hat Full of Stars album, stating, "The title track and "That's What I Think", along with "Sally's Pigeons", make for the most promising of the 11 cuts." In the December 23, 1995, issue of the Billboard magazine, the song was mentioned in "The Critics' Choice" section, where the magazine's editors and writers chose their top 10 records, videos and live concerts of 1995. Chuck Taylor, the magazine's radio editor, listed Lauper's 1995 compilation Twelve Deadly Cyns...and Then Some at #6 of his top ten albums, stating, "Kickin' longform video, too. Discover of "Sally's Pigeons" is a high point. Thanks, girl, I had fun." The Daily Vault's Mark Millan said it is a very good song, describing it as "heart wrenching".

Music video
A music video was made to accompany the song. It featured a then-unknown Julia Stiles. One of the "little girls in pony-tails" described in the song's lyrics is played by former Ford model Valerie Mendler. Sally is portrayed by Blaze Berdahl.

Track listing
5" CD (Austria 1993) – Epic (Sony) 659138 1
7" (Holland 1993) – Epic (Sony) 659138 7
CSS (Holland 1993) – Epic (Sony) EPC 659138 4

 "Sally's Pigeons" – 3:48
 "Cold" – 3:29

5" CD (Austria 1993) – Epic (Sony) 659138 2
12" (Holland 1993) – Epic (Sony) 659138 6

 "Sally's Pigeons" – 3:48
 "Cold" – 3:29
 "Like I Used To" – 4:28

5" CD (Austria 1993) – 661000 1 – cardboard re-release after "Hey Now" release.

 "Sally's Pigeons" – 3:47
 "Someone Like Me" – 4:03

5" CD (Germany 1993) – Epic (Sony) 661000 2 – re-release after "Hey Now" release.

 "Sally's Pigeons" – 3:46
 "Feels Like Christmas" – 4:34
 "Someone Like Me" – 4:07

References

Cyndi Lauper songs
1993 singles
Songs about abortion
Songs about death
Songs about birds
Songs written by Cyndi Lauper
Pop ballads
Songs written by Mary Chapin Carpenter
1990s ballads
1993 songs
Epic Records singles